Phyllis King and Dorothy Shepherd-Barron were the defending champions, but lost in the quarterfinals to Lolette Payot and Muriel Thomas.

Doris Metaxa and Josane Sigart defeated Helen Jacobs and Elizabeth Ryan in the final, 6–4, 6–3 to win the ladies' doubles tennis title at the 1932 Wimbledon Championships.

Seeds

  Eileen Fearnley-Whittingstall /  Betty Nuthall (third round)
  Helen Jacobs /  Elizabeth Ryan (final)
  Phyllis King /  Dorothy Shepherd-Barron (quarterfinals)
  Doris Metaxa /  Josane Sigart (champions)

Draw

Finals

Top half

Section 1

The nationality of Mrs G Hawkins is unknown.

Section 2

Bottom half

Section 3

Section 4

The nationalities of Mrs HW Backhouse and L Philip are unknown.

References

External links

Women's Doubles
Wimbledon Championship by year – Women's doubles
Wimbledon Championships - Doubles
Wimbledon Championships - Doubles